Qazvin is known to have had close to, or in excess of 100 drinking water reservoirs called ab anbars before modernization in the 20th century.

Only ten remain fully intact today. All are protected as national cultural heritage relics. The extant ab anbars of Qazvin are:
 
Ab anbar of Jame’ mosque

Built in 1682 (1093 AH lunar) during the reign of Shah Suleyman I Safavi, located next to the Jame’ (congregation) mosque, with the benefactor listed as Ali Khan-e Nāmi (6, 410). This ab anbar has a second private stairway that opens directly into the tank, for lay-rubi. The Sarooj covered walls are 2.4 meters thick (3, 80) surrounding all sides of the tank.

Ab anbar of Sardar e Bozorg

Two brothers by the names of Mohammad Hasan Khan and Mohammad Hosein Qoli Khan e Sardar who were commanders of The Qajar monarch Fath-ali shah's army make a vow to build a mosque, school, and ab anbar in the driest part of the city (3, 81) if they return victorious from a battle against the Russian army (1). This ab anbar was finished in 1812 (1227 AH lunar). Its walls are 3 m thick (3, 81).

Ab anbar of Sardar e Kuchak

With 37 steps, 4 faucets located at various intervals, four domes, and four semi-windcatchers, this ab anbar was built in 1814 (1229 AH lunar) as part of a school-mosque-ab anbar complex by the same two brothers (3, 82).

Ab anbar of Haj Kazem

With 40 steps, 2 faucets, and 2 windcatchers standing 8 m tall, and storage walls 3 m thick, this ab anbar was finished in 1840 (1256 AH lunar) in one of Qazvin's drier neighborhoods. The inscriptions on top of the sardar mention Haj Kazem Kuzehgar and his assistant Haji Ismail as the architects of the ab anbar.

Ab anbar of Hakim

With 36 steps, this ab anbar was finished in 1828 (1244 AH lunar) by Haj Mirza Hakim, a local physician. Next to the sardar, a saqqa-khaneh was built at the same time. This is a small enclave where people light candles in front of sacred images of Shia icons, and pray for requests (nazr).

Ab anbar of Mola Verdi Khan mosque

Built in 1763 (1177 AH lunar) according to the inscription on top of the sardar, during the reign of the Zand dynasty. The pasheer contains 2 gushvars.

Ab anbar of Zananeh Bazar

Constructed under charity by a benefactor by the name of Haj Mola Abdol-vahhab, who was a famous cleric in the Qajar era, its entry is located inside the bazaar of the coppersmiths, has 43 steps, 4 columns inside the storage tank, 10 flat domes, 5 windcatchers, and also has a separate stairway for layeh-rubi that is also connected to the basement of the adjacent mosque (3, 82).

Ab anbar of Agha

Also a relic of the Qajar era, with 30 steps, and walls 2.2 m thick.

Dimensions and capacity

See also

Iranian architecture
Ab Anbar
Traditional water sources of Persian antiquity

References

Memari e Islami e Iran. M. K. Pirnia. 
Minudar or Babuljanne. Gulriz, Mohammad Ali. Taha publications. 3rd printing. Qazvin. 1381 (2002).   
Qazvin: ayinah-yi tarikh va tabi’at-i Iran. Hazrati, Mohammad Ali. Sazeman e Irangardi va Jahangardi publications. Qazvin. 1382 (2003). 
Saimaa-yi ustaan-I Qazvain. Haji aqa Mohammadi, Abbas. Taha Publications. Qazvin. 1378 (1998). 
Memari-ye ab anbar haye shahr e Qazvin. Memarian, Gholamhosein. Asar. Vol 35. Miras Farhangi publications. Tehran. (p187-197).
Sair e Tarikhi e banaayi Shahr e Qazvin va Banaha-yi an. Siyaghi, Dr. Seyd Mohammad Dabir. Sazeman e Miras e Farhangi. Qazvin. 2002. 
M.J. Strauss. Old ways of water management spring up again in arid regions. International Herald Tribune. Aug 20, 2005.

Reservoirs in Iran
Buildings and structures in Qazvin Province
Ab anbars of Qazvin